Swimming at the 7th All-Africa Games was held September 12–18, 1999 at the Ellis Park Aquatic Complex in Johannesburg, South Africa. The six-day meet featured events in a 50-meter (long course) pool.

Participating nations
128 swimmers from 18 nations were entered in the competition. Among those with swimmers were:

Schedule
Note: Events are listed on correct day, but possibly not in the right order.

m= men's event, w= women's event

Results

Men

m1 In prelims of the men's 100 free, Algeria's Salim Iles set a new Games Record (GR) of 50.36.

Women

w1 In winning the Women's 100 and 200 Breaststrokes, South Africa's Penny Heynes defended the 2 titles she won at the 1995 All-Africa Games. 
w2 Order of swimmers for the women's 4x100 Free Relay may be off, however, Moody (Zimbabwe) and Van Selm (South Africa) were the fourth swimmers for their relays.

Medal standings

References

Swimming at the African Games
1999 All-Africa Games
A
Swimming competitions in South Africa
International aquatics competitions hosted by South Africa